Marynka  is a settlement in the administrative district of Gmina Wyrzysk, within Piła County, Greater Poland Voivodeship. It is situated in west-central Poland.

References

Marynka